Frederick William Eugene of Saxe-Hildburghausen (8 October 1730 - 4 December 1795) was a Prince of Saxe-Hildburghausen.

Life 
Eugene was born on
8 October 1730 in Hildburghausen. He was the younger son of the Duke Ernest Frederick II of Saxe-Hildburghausen and his wife Countess Caroline of Erbach-Fürstenau (1700–1758). His godfather was, in addition to other princes, Prince Eugene of Savoy.  At the wedding of his brother Ernest Frederick III Charles with the only daughter of the Danish royal couple, he was awarded the Ordre de l'Union Parfaite.  In Danish royal service he attained the rank of lieutenant-general of the infantry and in Hildburghausen, he was commander of the Artillery Corps.

In 1765, Eugene founded the porcelain factory at Kloster Veilsdorf.  His brother and the Duke, gave the factory many privileges.  Economic success, however, remained low.

Eugene was the owner of the manor Weitersroda where he founded a new parish and built a new church and a royal villa. In Hildburghausen, he was the tenant of the mint and builder of the so-called , one of the most beautiful buildings in the city.  Eugene was a skilled mechanic and gunner.

In 1769, Eugene and his great-uncle Joseph and Duchess Charlotte Amalie of Saxe-Meiningen were appointed Commissioner for the completely indebted Principality of Saxe-Hildburghausen by Emperor Joseph II. He misappropriated assets, leading to the dispute with Prince Joseph.

Following Eugene’s disgrace for misappropriation of money, he needed a place to stay. His sister Amalie and her husband Prince Louis of Hohenlohe-Neuenstein-Oehringen (23 May 1723 – 27 July 1805) invited him to live with them at Castle Öhringen. He accepted their offer and moved in 1770 to Öhringen. A few years later, on 13 March 1778, Eugene married his niece, the Princess Chrstiane (1761–1790), daughter of his brother Ernest Frederick III, Duke of Saxe-Hildburghausen. They had no children. Eugene and his wife resided at Öhringen, in the principality ruled by his brother-in-law Louis, and on a modest property belonging to him, until their respective deaths. Eugene's wife Christiane died in 1790 and he died in 1795.

Ancestry

References 
 Heinrich Ferdinand Schoeppl: Die Herzoge von Sachsen-Altenburg, Bozen, 1917, reprinted Altenburg, 1992
 Dr. Rudolf Armin Human: Chronik der Stadt Hildburghausen, Hildburghausen, 1886

Footnotes 

House of Saxe-Hildburghausen
Dukes of Saxe-Hildburghausen
House of Wettin
1730 births
1795 deaths
Sons of monarchs